The Lebanon Township Schools is a community public school district that serves students in pre-kindergarten through eighth grade from Lebanon Township, in Hunterdon County, New Jersey, United States. 

As of the 2018–19 school year, the district, comprising two schools, had an enrollment of 624 students and 64.6 classroom teachers (on an FTE basis), for a student–teacher ratio of 9.7:1.

The district is classified by the New Jersey Department of Education as being in District Factor Group "I", the second-highest of eight groupings. District Factor Groups organize districts statewide to allow comparison by common socioeconomic characteristics of the local districts. From lowest socioeconomic status to highest, the categories are A, B, CD, DE, FG, GH, I and J.

Starting in the 2018–19 school year, middle school students in grades 6 through 8 from the Hampton School District will attend Woodglen School on a tuition basis as part of a sending/receiving relationship.

Public school students in ninth through twelfth grades attend Voorhees High School, which also serves students from Califon, Glen Gardner, Hampton, High Bridge and Tewksbury Township. As of the 2018–19 school year, the high school had an enrollment of 982 students and 83.1 classroom teachers (on an FTE basis), for a student–teacher ratio of 11.8:1. The school is part of the North Hunterdon-Voorhees Regional High School District, which also includes students from Bethlehem Township, Clinton Town, Clinton Township, Franklin Township, Lebanon Borough and Union Township who attend North Hunterdon High School in Annandale.

Schools
Schools in the district (with 2018–19 enrollment data from the National Center for Education Statistics) are:
Elementary school
Valley View School with 310 students in grades PreK-4
Patricia A. Bell, Principal 
Middle school
Woodglen School with 320 students in grades 5-8
Michael B. Rubright, Principal

Both schools are located in Lebanon Township, but have a Califon mailing address.

Administration
Core members of the district's administration are:
Jason R. Kornegay, Superintendent
Abigail Postma, Business Administrator

Board of education
The district's board of education, with nine members, sets policy and oversees the fiscal and educational operation of the district through its administration. As a Type II school district, the board's trustees are elected directly by voters to serve three-year terms of office on a staggered basis, with three seats up for election each year held (since 2012) as part of the November general election.

References

External links
Lebanon Township Schools
 
School Data for the Lebanon Township Schools, National Center for Education Statistics
North Hunterdon-Voorhees Regional High School District

Lebanon Township, New Jersey
New Jersey District Factor Group I
School districts in Hunterdon County, New Jersey